DSTC may refer to:

Dartford Science & Technology College
Distributed Systems Technology Centre, an Australian research organization
Diplomatic Security Training Center, a training center for the U.S. Mobile Security Deployment
Duluth State Teachers College, previous name of University of Minnesota Duluth
Dynamic Stability and Traction Control, an electronic stability control and traction control system from Volvo